The 1948 Omloop Het Volk was the fourth edition of the Omloop Het Volk cycle race and was held on 17 March 1948. The race started and finished in Ghent. The race was won by Sylvain Grysolle.

General classification

References

1948
Omloop Het Nieuwsblad
Omloop Het Nieuwsblad